Ryan James Willis Stevenson (born 1987) is a Canadian musician from the province of Quebec. He released his debut album Better Late Than Never in February 2015 with "Never Let Me Go" as the single from the album. Renowned as a well-known professional drummer, he is also a singer, songwriter, and guitar and keyboards player.

Stevenson is also known as RJWS (acronym of his birth name) started his career in rock music as a member of bands Red October and Kamakazi. Some of both bands' music clips aired on Canadian French and English TV and radio stations and two albums have been released. Afterward, Stevenson embarked on a solo career as a drummer with personal shows, at various special and public events and in collaborations with a great number of artists including P. Diddy, Snoop Dogg, Wyclef Jean, Drake, French Montana, Waka Flocka Flame, Ace Hood, T-Pain, Mohombi, K.Maro, Shy'm, Corneille, Massari, Mia Martina, Sean Paul, Hedley, Karl Wolf, Danny Fernandes, Booba, Soprano (of Psy4), DJ Battle with La Fouine, The Bilz and Kashif, L'Algérino, Ricky J, Imposs (and Muzion), Ale Dee, Marco Volcy, 4Say. He can be seen featured in Canadian artist's Souldia's music videos "Ce n'était pas voulu" and "Je n'ai pas mal. "

and others.

In popular culture
The heavily tattooed Ryan Stevenson has been featured in several promotional posters and ads and a series of magazines as well as modelling. He was featured in Ridsa's debut hit single "Je n'ai pas eu le temps" which also featured Willy Williams. 

He has performed in several drums remix videos notably that of DJ Assad's video "Addicted" featuring Mohombi, Craig David, and Greg Parys. 

In 2014 Ryan was featured during the entrance ceremony of Haitian-Canadian professional boxing champion Jean Pascal, on 6 December at the Bell Centre in Montreal. He was featured with Jean during his Entrance.Jean Pascal vs. Lucian Bute.

Ryan spent some time in China representing and touring and teaching while showcasing popular drum brands such as Tama Drums, and Sabian.

After his time in China in 2019, Ryan began working with A.J. McLean from the Backstreet Boys  alongside Dj Lux, Franceso Yates, and others drumming for their Group ATCK also known as All The Cool Kids.

He has also performed with ATCK at the final Friday After 5 Music festival for the season in Owensboro Kentucky.

Personal life
He is the son of Stephanie Willis. She died in 2014 at the age of 57. Stevenson's track "Dear Mom" is dedicated to her with family footage in his music video for the song.

Discography

Albums

Singles

References

External links
 

Drummers
Canadian drummers
Canadian male drummers
Living people
Canadian people of English descent
Anglophone Quebec people
1987 births